Dermot Hanifin (born in Castleisland, County Kerry) is a former Irish sportsperson. He played Gaelic football with his local club Castleisland Desmonds and was a member of the Kerry senior inter-county team from 1985 until 1993. His father, also Dermot, played with Kerry during the 1950s.

Army Career

Hannafin is an officer in the Irish Army. His current rank is Lieutenant Colonel and is based in the Curragh Camp the main training centre for the Irish Defence Forces.

Playing Career

Club
Hanifin played his club football with his local Castleisland Desmonds club and enjoyed much success. He won a number of county club championship titles with Castleisland throughout the 1980s and 1990s. These victories allowed the club to represent the county in the provincial club championship. A 2-6 to 0-9 defeat of the famous St. Finbarr's club gave Hanifin a Munster club winners' medal. He later lined out in Croke Park for the All-Ireland final against St. Vincents of Dublin.  In one of the most dramatic endings ever a fifty-eighth minute goal gave Castleisland a 2-2 to 0-7 victory.  The win gave Hanifin an All-Ireland club winners' medal.

Hanifin collected a second consecutive Munster club winners' medal in 1985 as the mighty 'Barr's' were defeated for the second consecutive year. Castleisland later qualified for another All-Ireland final.  This time Burren provided the opposition and the game was another close affair.  A second-half goal secured the title for Burran as Hanifin's side were defeated by 1-10 to 1-6.

Intercounty
Hanifin also played with Kerry during the mid-1980s and early 1990s. He was part of the team that won Munster & All Ireland Championships in 1986 a year that would turn out to be Kerry's last All Ireland for 11 years.

References

External links
 http://www.terracetalk.com/kerry-football/player/181/Dermot-%28Jnr%29-Hanafin/League

Year of birth missing (living people)
Living people
Castleisland Gaelic footballers
Kerry inter-county Gaelic footballers
Winners of one All-Ireland medal (Gaelic football)